Astroblast! is an American children's animated television series created by Bob Kolar for Sprout.

The show is co-produced by Scholastic Media, Soup2Nuts and debuted on Sprout on July 12, 2014.  It began airing on NBC Kids, the Saturday morning programming block on NBC, on October 4, 2014. It is based on the book series Astroblast! by author and illustrator Bob Kolar.

It was the last show produced by Soup2Nuts before their closure on August 7, 2015.

In 2021, FilmRise picked up the show for distribution. Currently, the show is available for streaming via the FilmRise and The Roku Channel multimedia platforms in the United States, as well as on the Clan television channel and RTVE Play in Spain. The series is available in 8 languages and has aired in over 20 countries internationally.

Premise
Comet, Sputnik, Halley, Radar, and Jet are five high-spirited and fun-loving animals who live with their alien octopus friend Sal in the Astroblast Space Station, which also houses a large library and a smoothie café called the Frosty Star.

Cast
Vinnie Penna as Comet, Morg, Bloodoo, Flash, additional voices 
Gigi Abraham as Halley, Zelda, Sal's GamGam, Glippi, Bippity-Bops, additional voices
Veronica Taylor as Sputnik, Carly Cosmos, Bippity-Bops, Laney, additional voices 
Joe Gaudet as Radar, Bob, Cosmo Carson, additional voices 
John Taylor as Sal, Doobloo, additional voices

Episodes

Solo airings

Individual air dates for stories as a 15-minute program:

Duo airings

Coupled air dates as a 30-minute program:
 15 July 2014: Take Off! + Glippis Visit re-aired 13 January 2016
 8 October 2014: Are You My Piffin? + Halley's Wannabe
 25 October 2014: Smoothie Operator + Bend It Like Radar
 8 November 2014: I'll Save You + Don't Touch
 29 November 2014: "Sore Loser" + "Halley Goes Solo" re-aired 30 August 2015
 6 December 2014: Building the Perfect Present + ? re-aired 6 September 2015
 13 December 2014: "Beck and Call" + "Sputnik Takes Charge" re-aired 13 September 2015
 3 January 2015: Growing Crazy + Building the Perfect Present re-aired 3 January 2016
 25 April 2015: "Lights Out" + "Shoes Blue" re-aired 25 October 2015
 2 May 2015: "Shape Up" + "Puzzle Hunt" re-aired 1 November 2015
 9 May 2015: I Love a Parade! Sometimes ... + Radar Sleeps Over re-aired 8 November 2015
 16 May 2015: Stop Booging Me + Just Peachy re-aired 15 November 2015
 23 May 2015: Hole in One + Treasure Hunt re-aired 22 November 2015
 30 May 2015: Be Mine + Threes a Crowd re-aired 29 November 2015 A mailbox mix-up leaves Comet questioning his friendship with Halley.
 6 June 2015: Who's Afraid of the Big Bad Alligator + Sing Along to the Bouncing Monkey re-aired 6 December 2015 New customers are scared of Jet but they learn to trust him after he saves one from a fall.
 13 June 2015: I Feel Fine + Radar for a Day re-aired 13 December 2015 Sputnik is so excited for a Carly Cosmos contest, she tries to hide the fact she is sick.
 27 June 2015: Bop til You Drop + Kapowser re-aired 27 December 2015
 24 July 2015: A Gift From Halley + Best Guests re-aired 20 December 2015
 19 September 2015: "Comet's Gift" + "A Star Is Born" re-aired 20 September 2015 - Comet doesn't want to give a gift at the secret gift exchange.
 26 September 2015: "Don't Fear the Surfboard" + "Clean Machine" re-aired 27 September 2015 - Halley's late with a large order of smoothies leaving her questioning her job performance.

References

External links
 Astroblast official website
 https://web.archive.org/web/20160113015120/http://www.nbc.com/nbc-kids
 

2010s American animated television series
2010s American comic science fiction television series
2014 American television series debuts
2015 American television series endings
American children's animated space adventure television series
American children's animated comic science fiction television series
American preschool education television series
American television shows based on children's books
Animated preschool education television series
2010s preschool education television series
American flash animated television series
Animated television series about dogs
Animated television series about monkeys
Animated television series about pigs
Animated television series about rabbits and hares
Animated television series about extraterrestrial life
Television series by Soup2Nuts
English-language television shows